Richard Beaumont-Thomas (25 May 1860 – 14 February 1917) was the managing director of a major South Wales iron, steel and tinplate manufacturing company named Richard Thomas and Co Ltd, which eventually merged with Baldwins to become Richard Thomas and Baldwins.

Biography
He was born on 25 May 1860 at Oxford, the eldest son of his father, tinplate manufacturer Richard Thomas. Richard Beaumont Thomas married Nora Anderson, the fourth daughter of James Anderson a Tea Merchant, of Dundee and Elizabeth Ann Downes at Holy Trinity Church, Tulse Hill, London on 2 August 1888.

Richard and Nora produced four children:
Vera Nora Beaumont-Thomas (12 June 1889 – 24 November 1900)
Colonel Lionel Beaumont-Thomas MC MP (1 August 1893 – 7 December 1942)
Irene Murial Beaumont-Thomas (born 9 October 1894)
Reginald Alexander Beaumont-Thomas (born 3 September 1903)

Inventions
During 1885, assisted by Robert Davies, Richard Beaumont-Thomas invented a cleaning machine and a dusting machine. These machines made possible the continuous production of tinplate. Richard Beaumont-Thomas continued this inventive streak, in 1897 together with his brother Hubert Spence-Thomas, a continuous tinning machine was patented. The patents for these inventions were issued and utilised by the tinplate industry globally.

Will
Richard Beaumont-Thomas died on 14 February 1917 leaving a will of £449,285-18-9 pounds sterling.  The will, due to its complexity, was converted into a Private Bill, an Act of Parliament named the Beaumont Thomas Estate 1929 (19 & 20 Geo.5), read in the House of Lords.

References

1860 births
1917 deaths
19th-century Welsh businesspeople
20th-century Welsh businesspeople